Daniel Stephen Sugerman (October 11, 1954 – January 5, 2005) was the second manager of the Los Angeles-based rock band the Doors. He wrote several books about Jim Morrison and the Doors, including No One Here Gets Out Alive (co-authored with Jerry Hopkins), and the autobiography Wonderland Avenue: Tales of Glamour and Excess.

Early life
Sugerman grew up in Beverly Hills, his neighbors were Fred Astaire, Steve McQueen and Raquel Welch.  At eleven, his Jewish-American parents divorced and his mother Harriet moved Danny and his siblings to Westchester, Los Angeles where she lived with a prosecuting attorney who was a harsh disciplinarian. He attended Westchester High School in Los Angeles, where he regularly authored articles about The Doors in the student newspaper. He attended summer camp near Lakeshore City, California with Todd Fisher, Steven Crane Jr. and sons of Ken Venturi and Don Knotts.  He graduated in 1972.

Career
He began working with the Doors when he was 12 years old, by answering their fan mail. Following the death of Morrison in July 1971, aged 17, he replaced original Doors' manager, Bill Siddons.

He later went on to manage Ray Manzarek's solo-career and first album. He was also Iggy Pop's manager for a period, and produced his song "Repo Man", before they both ended up in mental hospitals suffering from drug and alcohol addiction. It was during this time that he was also manager for the L.A based glam/punk band, The Joneses, whose founder and lead singer, Jeff Drake, supplied them with high quality heroin.
He also wrote Appetite For Destruction: The Days of Guns N' Roses in 1991.

Personal life
For a time, Sugerman dated Mackenzie Phillips in the 80's.
He later married Fawn Hall of the Iran–Contra affair fame in 1993 and they remained married until his death. They briefly met MP3.com co-founder Rod Underhill while Hall was employed there. Underhill later stated that "Sugerman was very interesting. He had appeared to go out of his way to appear visually like Jim Morrison. Same type of haircut, similar clothing. The similarity was uncanny."  Sugerman discussed his idolization of Morrison in detail, in part of his book Wonderland Avenue: Tales of Glamour and Excess.

Sugerman was a recovering heroin addict who found solace in Buddhism.

Death
He died on January 5, 2005, in Los Angeles, from lung cancer, and is buried at Westwood Village Memorial Park Cemetery.

Books
No One Here Gets Out Alive (1980, with Jerry Hopkins)
The Doors, the Illustrated History (1983)
Wonderland Avenue: Tales of Glamour and Excess (1989)
Appetite For Destruction: The Days Of Guns N' Roses (1991)

References

External links

Sugerman Interview on addiction, Hollywood, and drug policy from December, 2000, accessed August 20, 2013
Obituary in Rolling Stone magazine accessed October 9, 2006
Obituary in San Diego Union-Tribune accessed October 9, 2006

1954 births
2005 deaths
Deaths from lung cancer in California
The Doors
Jewish American writers
Place of birth missing
Burials at Westwood Village Memorial Park Cemetery